Joachim (1448?-1567) served as Greek Patriarch of Alexandria between 1486 and 1567.

Joachim and Russia
In 1556, Joachim sent a letter to the Russian Czar Ivan IV, asking the Orthodox monarch to provide some material assistance for the Saint Catherine's Monastery in the Sinai Peninsula, which had suffered from the Turks. In 1558, the Czar sent to Egypt a delegation led by archdeacon Gennady, who, however, died in Constantinople before he could reach Egypt. From then on, the embassy was headed by a Smolensk merchant Vasily Poznyakov. Poznyakov's delegation visited Alexandria, Cairo, and Sinai, brought the patriarch a fur coat and an icon sent by the Czar, and left an interesting account of its two and half years' travels.

References
General

Specific

16th-century Patriarchs of Alexandria
Longevity claims
Eastern Orthodox saints
Christian religious leaders from the Mamluk Sultanate